John Regan: Sorry I'm Late is the debut album by American rapper John Regan. It was released by Culture VI Records on November 16, 2010 and distributed by Fat Beats Distribution. The album features collaborations with 6 Grammy Award winning and 10 multi-platinum selling musicians, having received over 880,000 paid song streams and purchases, to date.

The album was produced by YZ, Needlz, Nottz, 88-Keys and Dub B and features guest appearances by Marsha Ambrosius, Joell Ortiz, Skyzoo, Sha Stimuli, Naledge, Ill Bill, Wayna, Nottz, PackFM, James Gene Roston, Drew Hudson, Meylin, Nicholas Howard, and Juganot.

Wil Loesel and Yuri "YZ" Zwadiuk served as Executive Producers for the album, while Tony Dawsey of Masterdisk was the audio mastering engineer.

Background

In November, 2010 when the album released it peaked at number #3 on Amazon's "Best Sellers - East Coast" charts, and #35 overall in Hip-Hop/Rap new releases. It is currently available on all major digital formats.

Track listing

References

2010 albums
Albums produced by Needlz
Albums produced by Nottz